Paraskevas "Paris" Doumanis (born 30 October 2000) is a Greek professional footballer who plays as a right-back for Super League 2 club Veria.

References

2000 births
Living people
Greek footballers
Greece youth international footballers
Super League Greece 2 players
Ergotelis F.C. players
Veria NFC players
Association football fullbacks
Footballers from Veria
21st-century Greek people